Jennifer Edwards (born March 25, 1957) is an American actress. She came to national prominence for her role in the 1968 NBC made-for-television movie Heidi.

Career 
Her best known role was the NBC made-for-television movie Heidi (which interrupted the conclusion of the New York Jets vs. Oakland Raiders game now called The Heidi Bowl), which aired on November 17, 1968.

Besides acting in a number of movies, she also co-wrote the 1988 television movie Justin Case with her father.

Personal life 
She is the daughter of Patricia Walker and filmmaker Blake Edwards. Her stepmother is actress Julie Andrews. 

Edwards has two daughters, Kayti (b. 1976) and Hannah (b. 1993).

Filmography

Film

Television

References

External links 
 

1957 births
20th-century American actresses
21st-century American actresses
Actresses from Los Angeles
American child actresses
American film actresses
American television actresses
Living people